The Marshall Athletics was a Class-D South Central League baseball team based in Marshall, Texas United States that played in 1912. They were managed by Harry Kane, who played four seasons in the major leagues. They finished second in the league, behind the Longview Cannibals, with a 56-58 record.

They were the first known professional baseball team to be based in Marshall, Texas.

References

Baseball teams established in 1912
Defunct minor league baseball teams
Marshall, Texas
Defunct baseball teams in Texas
Professional baseball teams in Texas
1912 establishments in Texas
Defunct South Central League teams
Baseball teams disestablished in 1912